The Shepherd Lassie of Argyle is a 1914 British silent drama film directed by Laurence Trimble and starring Florence Turner, Rex Davis and Hector Dion.

Cast
 Florence Turner as Mary Lachan 
 Rex Davis as Alan MacPherson 
 Hector Dion as The MacPherson 
 Clifford Pembroke as Lachlan 
 Isobel Carma as Isobel 
 Arnold Rayner as The Maniac

References

Bibliography
 Low, Rachael. The History of the British Film 1914-1918. Routledge, 2005.

External links
 

1914 films
1914 drama films
British silent feature films
British drama films
Films directed by Laurence Trimble
Films set in Scotland
British black-and-white films
1910s English-language films
1910s British films
Silent drama films